Kanna Talli is a 1953 Indian Telugu-language drama film, produced and directed by K. S. Prakash Rao under the Prakash Studios banner. It stars Akkineni Nageswara Rao, G. Varalakshmi  with music composed by Pendyala Nageshwara Rao. The film is the debut of Telugu popular singer P. Suseela and actress Rajasulochana into the film industry. Kanna Talli bears some resemblance to Mehboob Khan's Aurat (1940) but is a totally different story than the former. The film was simultaneously shot in Tamil as Petra Thai. Dialogues were penned by S. A. Subbaraman.

Plot
The film begins on wealthy couple Chalapathi (R. Nageshwara Rao) & Shantamma (G. Varalakshmi) who lead a happy family life with two sons Ramu & Shankar. Chalapathi is the one that spendthrifts for his vanity. Hence, he bankrupts and absconds leaving behind the family. During that plight, Shantamma rides out courageously and fosters the children. Behold of her struggle the elder one Ramu aims to carve his brother as a civilized person. Years roll by, Ramu (Akkineni Nageswara Rao) exerts himself and Shankar (Nambiar) successfully accomplishes the school file. Parallelly, he falls for Gowri (T. D. Vasantha) daughter of their uncle Nagaiah (Babji). At Present, Ramu aspires to admit Shankar in college for which performs a rich alliance with Rs.10,000 of dowry. Since his wife Lakshmi (C. Varalakshmi) is a virago she pesters her mother-in-law. Besides, in the city, Shankar turns as a spoiled brat with the association of a dancer Chanchala (Shanta). Learning it, Ramu lands where he is badly humiliated by Shankar. Distressed Ramu returns when Lakshmi pulls his authority and dominates him. After some time, Shankar backs and confronts his brother for his share. Thereupon, Shantamma strikes and necks out him when warmhearted Ramu forgives and lets him in. But deceitful Shankar heists Lakshmi's jewelry and Shanta becomes culpable, so, she is spurned from the house. Being cognizant of Shankar's behavior, Nagaiah calls off the match when blue Gowri attempts suicide and Shantamma rescues her. Here, Shantamma provides an assurance to get back Shankar. By the time, Shankar discovers the devilish face of Chanchala and as enranged he slaughters her. Witnessing it, Shantamma indicts herself in the crime which reforms Shankar. Knowing it, Ramu rushes to his mother. Now the wheel of fortune makes Shantamma meet with her husband Chalapathi in the prison here and now as a wanderer. At last, Shantamma seeks Ramu to maintain silence and also to couple up Shankar & Gowri. Finally, the movie ends with Shantamma moving towards condemning.

Cast

Male cast
 Akkineni Nageshwara Rao 
 R. Nageswara Rao 
 M. N. Nambiar 
 Peketi Sivaram 
 Mikkilineni 
 Pendyala Nageswara Rao 
 Babji 
 Koduru Achaiah Chowdary 
 Pasumarti 

Female cast
 G. Varalakshmi 
 Rajasulochana 
 T. D. Vasantha 
 Annapurna 
 Shanta 
 C. Varalakshmi

Soundtrack

Music composed by Pendyala Nageshwara Rao. Music released on Audio Company.
Telugu songs

Tamil Songs
Lyrics were penned by M. S. Subramaniam. Playback singers are N. Lalitha, M. S. Sarojini, Ghantasala, A. M. Rajah, P. Susheela and K. Rani. The song Yaedukku Azhaithai is the first song in Tamil film sung by P. Susheela.

References

External links
 

1953 films
1950s Telugu-language films
1950s Tamil-language films
Indian black-and-white films
Indian multilingual films
Films scored by Pendyala Nageswara Rao
Films directed by K. S. Prakash Rao
Indian drama films
1953 drama films